Polycera odhneri is a species of sea slug, a nudibranch, a shell-less marine gastropod mollusc in the family Polyceridae.

Distribution 
This species was described from Sao Paulo, Brazil. It has been reported from Lake Worth Lagoon, Florida, USA.

References

Polyceridae
Gastropods described in 1955